Dillenia indica, commonly known as elephant apple or Ou Tenga, is a species of Dillenia native to China and tropical Asia.

Description
It is an evergreen large shrub or small to medium-sized tree growing to 15 m tall. The leaves are 15–36 cm long, with a conspicuously corrugated surface with impressed veins. Its branches are used to make good firewood. The flowers are large, 15–20 cm diameter, with five white petals and numerous yellow stamens. Its characteristic round fruits are large, greenish yellow, have many seeds and are edible. The fruit is a 5–12 cm diameter aggregate of 15 carpels, each carpel containing five seeds embedded in an edible but fibrous pulp.

Taxonomy
Dillenia indica was one of the many species first described by Linnaeus in the 10th edition of his Systema Naturae in 1759.

Ecology
Dillenia indica produces a large hard edible fruit which is accessible only to the megaherbivores in the wild. A study in the Buxa Tiger Reserve by ecologists Sekar & Sukumar has shown that Asian elephants appear to have a particular fondness for the fruits of D. indica, and are hence an important seed disperser for this tree. With the prospect of extinction of the elephants this tree has developed a back-up system, whereby its hard fruits that were only accessible to megaherbivores, slowly soften on the forest floor through the dry season to allow access to successively smaller animals such as macaques, rodents and squirrels. Seeds from both old and soft fruits are able to germinate well, enabling the persistence of this tree to be independent of the survival of its major megaherbivore disperser.

Uses
The fruit pulp is sour and used in Indian cuisine in curries, jam (ouu khatta), and jellies.

Because it is a main source of food for elephants, monkeys and deer, collection of fruit from the core areas of the forest is prohibited. Commercial sale of the fruit is also prohibited, in an effort to help keep the food-chain system of the forest from dismantling totally.

References

indica
Trees of China
Flora of tropical Asia
Plants described in 1753
Taxa named by Carl Linnaeus